Renata Scaglia (born 24 April 1954 in Turin) is a former Italian discus thrower.

Biography
She won three medals, at senior level, at the International athletics competitions. She has 31 caps in national team from 1973 to 1984. After sport career, she has been teaching Scienze motorie e sportive at the University of Turin.

Achievements

National titles
Renata Scaglia has won 8 times the individual national championship.
7 wins in the discus throw (1973, 1974, 1975, 1976, 1978, 1981, 1984)
1 win in the discus throw at the Italian Winter Throwing Championships (1984)

See also
 Italy at the 1979 Mediterranean Games

References

External links
 Renata Scaglia at All-athletics.com

1954 births
Living people
Italian female discus throwers
Sportspeople from Turin
Mediterranean Games gold medalists for Italy
Mediterranean Games silver medalists for Italy
Mediterranean Games bronze medalists for Italy
Athletes (track and field) at the 1975 Mediterranean Games
Athletes (track and field) at the 2005 Mediterranean Games
Mediterranean Games medalists in athletics